Home for Christmas is a Norwegian television series that premiered on Netflix in December 2019. It stars Ida Elise Broch as Johanne, who scrambles to get a boyfriend to bring home for Christmas Eve.

The romantic drama comedy consists of six 30-minute episodes in each season and was Netflix's first Norwegian original series. The series received mostly positive reviews.

Related: Netflix  Odio Il Natale / I Hate Christmas

Synopsis 
Johanne (Broch) is a nurse in her 30s, working at a hospital in Norway. During Advent dinner, she feels pressured by her family to be in a relationship. She lies and tells them that she has a boyfriend, and that he will accompany her to Christmas dinner.

Johanne then tries to find a boyfriend through speed dating, internet dating, and other means. She goes on dates with several men, including 18 year old Jonas (Felix Sandman), and the much older Bengt Erik (Bjørn Skagestad). She also has a brief sexual encounter with Eira, one of her female coworkers.

None of this results in Johanne finding a boyfriend. In the last episode of season one, coworker Dr. Henrik tells her that he loves her. They are interrupted by a medical emergency before she can respond.  She then goes to her parents' house for Christmas dinner. During dinner, the doorbell rings. The first season ends with a shot of Johanne's face as she opens the door, possibly for one of her suitors.

Production 
The series takes place in Oslo, with winter scenes taking place in the copper mining town Røros. Unexpected warmth resulted in snow being transported from Røros Airport to create the winter scenes. It was produced by the Oslo Company, and financed and distributed by Netflix as an original series.

The idea for the show was created by two advertisement students, Amir Shaheen and Kristian Andersen, who derived the concept from the popular Nordic TV Christmas calendars, televised advent calendars with an episode broadcast each day of December until Christmas Eve. They decided not to draw inspiration from Christmas films but rather other Norwegian series such as the teenage series Skam. They pitched the idea to the Oslo Company.

Cast and characters 

 Ida Elise Broch as Johanne, 30 year old nurse and protagonist
 Gabrielle Leithaug as Jørgunn, Johanne's roommate and best friend
 Dennis Storhøi as Tor, Johanne's father
 Anette Hoff as Jorid, Johanne's mother
 Ghita Nørby as Mrs. Nergaard, COPD patient at the hospital
 Hege Schøyen as Bente, manages the nurses at the hospital
 Bjørn Skagestad as Bengt Erik, politician and businessman
 Felix Sandman as Jonas, 19 year old Johanne meets online
 Line Verndal as Eira, works at the hospital
  as Henrik, a doctor
 Iselin Shumba as Jeanette, good friend to Johanne, has children with Trym

Episodes

Season 1 (2019)

Season 2 (2020)

Reception 
The series received mostly positive reviews. Verdens Gang gave it three out of six stars, likening it to a hybrid of Bridget Jones and Love Actually with a pointless narrative, but NRK called it a must-see for fans of Christmas romances and praised it for a well made atmosphere of Christmas hygge (coziness).

Leah Thomas of Cosmopolitan said "This soap opera drama series will have your jaw dropping with all the twists turns imaginable. Besides the fact that it's perfectly messy, I love this show because I have no idea who I want Johanne to end up with. Actually, I don't know if I even want her to end up with anyone, and I think that’s the entire point."

See also
 List of Christmas films

References

External links 

Television shows set in Norway
Norwegian drama television series
Norwegian comedy television series
Serial drama television series
2010s Norwegian television series
2019 Norwegian television series debuts
Norwegian-language Netflix original programming
Christmas television series